Raoul John Njeng-Njeng (born 1 April 1991), better known by his stage name Skales (an acronym for Seek Knowledge Acquire Large Entrepreneurial Skills), is a Nigerian rapper, singer, and songwriter. In 2000, he started writing rap songs in Kaduna, Nigeria. Between 2007 and 2008, he travelled to Jos to work with Jesse Jagz and Jeremiah Gyang. In 2008, he entered the Zain Tru Search competition and won the competition's North Central region. His debut single "Must Shine" received numerous spin on the Rhythm FM stations in Lagos, Jos and Abuja. He later relocated to Lagos and signed a record deal with Empire Mates Entertainment (E.M.E) in 2009.

Skales has collaborated with numerous artists, including Akon, ELDee, Tekno, Harmonize, Jeremiah Gyang, Banky W., and Knighthouse. His well-known songs include "Shake Body", "Mukulu", "Keresimesi", "Komole", "My Baby", "Take Care of Me" and "Denge Pose". After leaving E.M.E in May 2014, he set up the independent OHK Music record label. His debut studio album Man of the Year was released in 2015.

Life and career
A native of Edo State, Raoul John Njeng-Njeng was born and raised in Kaduna State. He grew up in a single-parent household with his mother, who did menial jobs to nurture him. Skales became interested in music while regularly attending his mother's cassette store. He met producers Jeremiah Gyang and Jesse Jagz while attending the University of Jos (Unijos). He took part in the Zain Tru Search Competition during his time at Unijos and won the competition's North Central region. Skales left Unijos his junior year and attended Lead City University, where he graduated with a degree in office management and technology. His debut single "Must Shine" was released to critical acclaim. In an interview with This Day newspaper in 2013, Skales described himself as an entertainer whose music is influenced by his surroundings. His 2009 release "Heading for a Grammy" was inspired by Kanye West's "Jesus Walks". The experiences he was going through at the time helped shape the scope of the song, which is an ode to self empowerment.

2009–14: Empire Mates Entertainment
Skales signed a record deal with E.M.E after meeting Banky W. in 2009. He released the singles "Mukulu" and "Keresimesi" simultaneously. Both songs were produced by Sarz and released under the outfit. The music video for the latter track was directed by Clarence Peters and uploaded to YouTube on 28 November 2011. Skales was one of the main acts on E.M.E's debut compilation album, Empire Mates State of Mind (2012). He collaborated with Banky W., Wizkid, Shaydee, Niyola and DJ Xclusive on five of the album's seven singles. He also toured with some of the aforementioned acts on the EME US Tour, which kicked off on 4 July and ended on 2 September 2012. E.M.E acts performed in several different cities, including Houston, Dallas, Toronto, Vancouver, New York City, Providence, Calgary, Atlanta, Washington, D.C., and Chicago. Skales supported Wizkid on his tour of London in 2012. On 17 October 2013, he performed at the 2013 edition of Felabration, a yearly concert dedicated to Fela Kuti. In February 2014, Vanguard newspaper reported that Skales left E.M.E following the expiration of his four-year recording contract. E.M.E executives believed they were not getting remunerated for investing in him and refused to renew his contract.

OHK Music establishment
In May 2014, Skales established his own record label, OHK music. The label is home to producer Drey Beatz and has affiliations with other music personnel within Nigeria. On 6 May 2014, Skales released the Jay Pizzle-produced track "Shake Body" as the lead single from his debut studio album Man of the Year. The accompanying music video for the song was uploaded to YouTube on 22 July 2014. Skales promoted the song by announcing the Shake Body video competition. It was reported that Skales signed a record deal with Timaya's Dem Mama Records following his departure from E.M.E. In February 2014, Skales debunked the reports and said he didn't sign with Dem Mama Records.

Personal life
In December 2011, Skales was involved in a car accident along the Lekki-Epe Expressway. The car he was in ran into a ditch and somersaulted. The accident left one dead and three injured.

He was among several other celebrities like Davido, and Super Eagles player John Ogu to criticize Desmond Elliot for pushing social media regulation back in October 2020.

On March 14, 2021, Skales announced his engagement to his girlfriend on Instagram.

Discography

Studio albums
Man of the Year (2015)
The Never Say Never Guy (2017)
Mr Love (2018)

Compilation albums
Empire Mates State of Mind (2012)

Selected singles

See also

 List of Nigerian musicians

References

External links
Skales at SoundCloud

Nigerian male rappers
21st-century Nigerian male singers
1991 births
Living people
Nigerian hip hop singers
Yoruba-language singers
University of Jos alumni
Lead City University alumni